Da Hood is the only album by Menace Clan, released on October 10, 1995, through Rap-a-Lot Records. They guested on a few tracks for other artists before breaking up in 2000.

The album did not have much commercial success outside of Houston, reaching number 44 on the Billboard Top R&B/Hip-Hop Albums chart and 33 on the Top Heatseekers chart. Two singles were released from the album, "Da Hood" and "What You Say," both of which had accompanying music videos, though neither charted in Billboard.

Track listing
"Aggravated Mayheim!" - 3:08 
"Mad Nigga" - 4:17 
"Record Deal" - 3:15 
"Life" - 4:44 
"Runaway Slave" - 5:25 
"Da Hood"(featuring Bushwick Bill) - 4:42 
"What You Say" - 4:02 
"Da Bullet" - 3:44 
"Cold World" - 4:41 
"Me by Myself" - 3:37 
"Have You Ever Heard" - 3:56 
"Last Driveby" - 3:34 
"Kill Whitey" - 2:48

Charts

References

1995 debut albums
Rap-A-Lot Records albums
Menace Clan albums